The Dress Act 1746 was part of the Act of Proscription which came into force on 1 August 1746 and made wearing "the Highland Dress" — including the kilt — illegal in Scotland as well as reiterating the Disarming Act. The Jacobite Risings between 1689 and 1746 found their most effective support amongst the Scottish clans, and this act was part of a series of measures attempting to bring the clans under government control. An exemption allowed the kilt to be worn in the army along with its veterans who have served in the military, continuing the tradition established by the Black Watch regiment.

The law was repealed in 1782. By that time kilts and tartans were no longer ordinary Highland wear, ended by enforcement of the law and by the circumstances of the Highland clearances, but within two years Highland aristocrats set up the Highland Society of Edinburgh and soon other clubs followed with aims including promoting "the general use of the ancient Highland dress". This would lead to the Highland pageant of the visit of King George IV to Scotland.

The act

Abolition and Proscription of the Highland Dress 19 George II, Chap. 39, Sec. 17, 1746:

Repeal
On 1 July 1782 royal assent was given to Repeal of the Act Proscribing the Wearing of Highland Dress 22 George III, Chap. 63, 1782 and a proclamation issued in Gaelic and English announced:

See also 

 Jacobite rising of 1745
 Highland Clearances
 Highland Potato Famine
 Scottish patriotism
 Scottish Wars

References

External links
Act Against the Highland Dress

History of the Scottish Highlands
Political history of Scotland
Acts of the Parliament of Great Britain concerning Scotland
1746 in law
1746 in Great Britain
1746 in Scotland
Clothing controversies